Emil Leyde (8 January 1879 in Kassel – January 1955 in Berlin) was a German film director, screenwriter, cameraman and film producer.

Filmography (selection) 
 1915: 
 1918: Der Sonnwendhof.
 1919: Die lichtscheue Dame.
 1919: Alte Zeit – neue Zeit.
 1919: Die Czàrdàsfürstin.
 1919: Wem gehört das Kind?
 1920: Alpentragödie.
 1923: Fiat Lux
 1924: Die Rieseneishöhlen des Dachsteins

References

External links 
 
 Emil Leyde on Filmportal
 Emil Leyde on The German Early Cinema Database
 Emil Leyde on Kinotv.com

1879 births
1955 deaths
Mass media people from Kassel
Film people from Hesse